West Denbighshire, formally called the Western Division of Denbighshire, was a county constituency in  Denbighshire, in North Wales.  It returned one Member of Parliament (MP) to the House of Commons of the Parliament of the United Kingdom, elected by the  first past the post voting system.

History

The constituency was created by the Redistribution of Seats Act 1885 for the 1885 general election, when the two-member Denbighshire constituency was divided into and Eastern and Western divisions.  It was abolished for the 1918 general election.

Members of Parliament

Elections

Elections in the 1880s

Elections in the 1890s

Elections in the 1900s

Elections in the 1910s 

General Election 1914–15:

Another General Election was required to take place before the end of 1915. The political parties had been making preparations for an election to take place and by July 1914, the following candidates had been selected; 
Liberal: John Roberts
Unionist: W. Henry Williams

References 

Historic parliamentary constituencies in North Wales
Constituencies of the Parliament of the United Kingdom established in 1885
Constituencies of the Parliament of the United Kingdom disestablished in 1918
History of Denbighshire